Khirbet Shema is an archaeological site located in Israel at the foot of Mount Meron. It features the ruins of a large Jewish village of the Roman and Byzantine periods, including the remains of an ancient synagogue and a mausoleum. It may be identified with the ancient Teqoa of Galilee.

Identification 
Several researchers have identified the site with the ancient Teqoa of Galilee (not to be confused with Teqoa, Judea), although no evidence has been discovered to verify this identification.

The site
Khirbet Shema is the traditional burial site of Shammai, a contemporary and opponent of Hillel the Elder.

Excavations 
American archaeologist Eric M. Meyers excavated the site from 1970 to 1972 on behalf of the American Schools of Oriental Research. The area recovered exceeded six acres.

Excavations have uncovered a large mausoleum, numerous tombs and an ancient synagogue. Additionally, their work included "uncovering adjacent buildings and surrounding parts of the village." Even by 1974, having worked with up to 80 people, no remnants of the synagogue's roof were found.

Analysis
Researchers have reviewed the "coins, glass, plaster, ceramic stone, bone, jewelry and some organic materials" found. Although "over 4,000 artifacts have been found in the excavations," there is little evidence of late Hellenistic colonization and the end of Roman times at the site.

The team's Co-head, Dr. James F. Strange, professor of biblical archeology at University of South Florida, indicated that the ruins of the synagogue show it to be unique, both for the area and time of construction. "There were several factors which led us to believe the building was quite unlike any other synagogue in that part of Palestine." Specific features he found noteworthy included "foundation walls .. nearly two feet thick, .. an entrance staircase .. stairs ten feet wide ... and a number of underground chambers."

The bulk of the coins suggest that this area was populated from 180 to around 417 CE, when "the village was destroyed by .. an earthquake."

Shape of the building
Excavations done in "different sites in upper Galilee: Shema, Meiron, Gush Halav and Nabratein" helped uncover more information about the debate as to "whether the earliest Galilean synagogues .. were built on a so-called basilical plan .. as opposed to a broad building" known as "a broadhouse plan." Khirbet Shema and two other ancient synagogues excavated around the same time all were broadhouse.

Bibliography
 Robert J. Bull, "Khirbet Shema", in: Israel Exploration Journal, 20: 232-34, 1970 
 Robert J. Bull, "Khirbet Shema", in: American Journal of Archaeology, 75: 196-97, 1971 
 
 Eric M. Meyers:
 "Horvat Shema ', the Settlement and the Synagogue", in: Qadmoniot, 5, 2: 58-61, 1972 
 Ancient Synagogue Excavations at Khirbet Shema, Upper Galilee, Israel, 1970–72, Cambridge: American Schools of Oriental Research, 1976
 "Ancient Synagogues in Galilee: Their Religious and Cultural Significance", in: Biblical Archaeologist, 43, 2: 97-108, 1980 
  With James F. Strange, Archeology, the Rabbis, and Early Christianity, Nashville: Abingdon, 1981 
 "Stratigraphic and Ceramic Observations from the Medieval Strata of Khirbet Shema, Israel: 
 Assessment of the Value of Scientific Analysis", in: Bulletin of the American Schools of Oriental Research (en), 260: 61-69, 1985

Additional reading

Books
 Ancient Synagogue Excavations at Khirbet Shema', Upper Galilee, Israel 1970-72. (Annual of the American Schools of Oriental Research 42). Durham: Duke University Press, 1976. By A. Thomas Kraabel (With E.M. Meyers and J.F. Strange).

Articles
 "Khirbet Shema' et Meiron." (A. Thomas Kraabel) Revue biblique 80 (1973) 585-587 + P.. 34f.
 "Khirbet Shema' and Meiron." (A. Thomas Kraabel, With E. M. Meyers and J. F. Strange). Israel Exploration Journal 22 (1972) 174-176 + PI. 37f.

References

This wiki article started as a machine (google) translation of https://fr.wikipedia.org/wiki/Khirbat_Shema (French), but also with
information from CACM (English, Feb. 1974, "Synagogue of Khirbet Shema Restored").

External links
On other Wikimedia projects: 
 
 (en) "Khirbat Shema" , creighton.edu site  
 Archeology portal 
 Portal Ancient Israel and Jews in Antiquity

Archaeological sites in Israel
Ancient Jewish settlements of Galilee
Ancient synagogues in the Land of Israel